St James Capua Hospital, or Saint James Hospital Sliema, started out in 1996 as the Capua Palace Hospital. In 2002 it was taken over by the Saint James Hospital Group, which owns other hospitals in Malta, Libya and Hungary. 

It is an 80 bed unit in Sliema, Malta. The hospital occupies part of the former "Capua Palace" building (Palazzo Capua), built over 200 years ago. 

It is a private hospital offering a very broad range of services, and is very strong in the field of obstetrics and infertility work.

See also
List of hospitals in Malta

References

External links
Official web site

Hospitals established in 1996
Sliema
Private hospitals in Malta
1996 establishments in Malta